William Hancock (1863–1955) was an Anglican priest in Australia, most notably Archdeacon of Melbourne  from 1928 to 1935.
 
Hancock was educated at Trinity College, Melbourne and  ordained in 1888. Hindley served at Nathalia, St Kilda, Sandhurst, Euroa, Fitzroy, Bairnsdale, Moonee Ponds and Brighton. He was Rural Dean of Melbourne from 1910 to 1918; a Canon of St Paul's Cathedral, Melbourne from 1912; and Chaplain to Harrington Lees, the Archbishop of Melbourne from 1914.

His son Keith was a prominent Australian historian.

References

1863 births
1955 deaths
People educated at Trinity College (University of Melbourne)
Archdeacons of Melbourne